
This is a list of aircraft in numerical order of manufacturer followed by alphabetical order beginning with 'M'.

Mm

MMIST 
(Mist Mobility Integrated Systems Technology)
 MMIST CQ-10A Snowgoose – parafoil
 MMIST CQ-10B Snowgoose – autogyro

MMPL
(Maintenance Command Development Centre, Kanpur)
 MMPL Kanpur

References

Further reading

External links 

 List of Aircraft (M)

fr:Liste des aéronefs (I-M)